Joseph William Abbott  was Dean of Leighlin from 1912 until 1939.

Bolton was educated at Trinity College, Dublin and ordained deacon in 1876 and priest in 1876. He began his ecclesiastical career with a curacy in Bilboa. He held incumbencies in Old Leighlin, Tullow and Kiltennel.

He died on 25 April 1939.

Notes

1939 deaths
Alumni of Trinity College Dublin
Deans of Leighlin
Year of birth missing